This a list of Acura vehicles. Acura is the luxury division of Honda.

Current models

Former Models

Concept vehicles
Acura Precision (2016)
Acura GSX (2009)
Acura Stealth (2008)
Acura 2+1 (2008)
Acura Advanced Sports Car (2007)
Acura Advanced Sedan (2006)
Acura CL-X (1995, entered production as the Acura CL in 1996)

See also 

 List of Honda automobiles

References

Acura vehicles
Acura